U Thant Island (officially Belmont Island) is a small artificial island or islet in the borough of Manhattan in New York City. The  island, created during the construction of the Steinway Tunnel directly underneath, is the smallest island in Manhattan.

Location and jurisdiction
It lies midway between the United Nations Headquarters at 42nd Street, in Manhattan to the west, and Gantry Plaza State Park in Long Island City, within Queens to the east. It is legally part of Manhattan and is formally a part of Manhattan Community District 6, which also includes the neighborhoods of Turtle Bay and Murray Hill to the west of U Thant Island.

The island is owned by the New York State Government and is currently protected as a sanctuary for migrating birds, including a small colony of double-crested cormorants. The cormorant population more than doubled from 2000 to 2011. The Borough, Block and Lot is Manhattan, Block 1373 (shared with Roosevelt Island), and Lot 200. Public access is prohibited. Since 2016, the island has been designated a Recognized Ecological Complex under the city's Waterfront Revitalization Program. The reefs in the waters surrounding the island make it a popular spot for boats fishing for striped bass. The United States Coast Guard maintains a 57-foot (17 m) tall lighted beacon on the island, designated "Roosevelt Island Reef Light 17"; an earlier 23-foot (7 m) tall light had been erected in 1938, and another pair before then.

Mean sea level in the East River is sometimes measured in reference to the "Belmont Island Datum", 2.265 feet (0.69 m) below that of Sandy Hook.

History
In the 1890s, businessman William Steinway began a project to construct a tunnel for trolleys under the East River to link Manhattan to his eponymous company town, Steinway Village, in Astoria, Queens; the tunnel would be named the Steinway Tunnel after him. As part of this construction project, a shaft dug into the granite outcrop known as Man-o'-War Reef to reach the tunnels produced excess landfill that built up the reef and created a small island. Steinway died before his tunnels' completion, and financier August Belmont Jr. saw the project to completion between 1905 and 1907. Belmont Island, named after the financier, became the legal name of the island. Four workers were killed in a 1906 shaft accident under the island. The tunnels, which pass directly beneath the island, are still used by the IRT Flushing Line, and are now part of the New York City Subway system. Buildings from the tunnel stayed up until at least 1918.

In 1964, the  Norwegian fuel oil tanker Sigdal ran aground on the island, imperiling East River traffic.

In 1968, the Hudson Institute published a proposal for connecting Roosevelt Island and U Thant Island by landfill to form a single larger island, as part of an economic redevelopment. 42nd Street would have extended across the island from Manhattan to Queens, connected by a Ponte Vecchio-like bridge covered in shops. "Belmont Center", modeled on Rockefeller Center, would have had towers of up to 80 stories.

A Jet d'Eau–like fountain sponsored by George T. Delacorte Jr. stood nearby on Roosevelt Island from 1969 to 1987, and faced calls for its relocation to U Thant Island due to environmental hazards throughout its existence, at the time of its installation, in a 1972–74 lawsuit, and at the time it was finally demolished.

In 1972, the island was declared "Soviet Jewry Freedom Island" and symbolically occupied for  hours by activists led by Manhattan and Bronx Borough Presidents Percy Sutton and Robert Abrams to protest a United Nations speech by Leonid Brezhnev and the imposition of the diploma tax as a barrier to emigration from the Soviet Union.

In 1977, the island was adopted by a group called the Peace Meditation at the United Nations, employees at the United Nations headquarters and followers of the guru Sri Chinmoy, who served as the interfaith chaplain there. They leased the island from New York State, greened its surface, and unofficially renamed it after the Burmese former United Nations Secretary General U Thant, a friend of Chinmoy. In 1982, Belmont Island was officially rededicated as U Thant Island. It is now the site of a metal "oneness arch", preserving personal items of the island's namesake.

In 1999, The New York Times Magazine staged an international competition to design a time capsule to preserve artifacts for the next millennium. An entry by Caples Jefferson Architects proposed a granite obelisk on U Thant Island that would gradually disintegrate, leaving only the time capsule by the end of the 30th century.

During the 2004 Republican National Convention, local artist and filmmaker Duke Riley, who has traveled to various abandoned islands around the New York City area, rowed a boat with a friend to the island under cover of darkness, proclaimed it a sovereign nation and hoisted a -long pennant depicting two electric eels from the island's navigation tower. On their return voyage in daylight, they were apprehended by a United States Coast Guard boat but were not arrested. The entire incident was videotaped for a piece Riley titled Belmont Island (SMEACC).

References

External links

 Forgotten NY: An Island just for U and ...to the New York Islands
 NYC Audubon Harbor Herons Project: Harbor Herons Nesting Survey, 2004–2011 reports on cormorant and gull nesting activity at U Thant Island
 NYCSubway.org: The Steinway Tunnels

Artificial islands of New York (state)
Belmont family
Islands of Manhattan
Islands of the East River
Sri Chinmoy